Cyclophora ampligutta is a moth in the  family Geometridae. It is found in New Guinea and Australia.

References

Moths described in 1896
Cyclophora (moth)
Moths of New Guinea
Moths of Australia